Henk is a Dutch male given name, originally a short form of Hendrik. It influenced "Hank" which is used in English-speaking countries (mainly in the US) as a form of "Henry". People named "Henk" include:

Academics
Henk Aertsen (born 1943), Dutch Anglo-Saxon linguist
Henk Barendregt (born 1947), Dutch logician
Henk Jaap Beentje (born 1951), Dutch botanist
Henk Blezer (born 1961), Dutch Tibetologist, Indologist, and scholar of Buddhist studies
Henk Bodewitz (born 1939), Dutch Sanskrit scholar
Henk J. M. Bos (born 1940), Dutch historian of mathematics
Henk Braakhuis (born 1939), Dutch historian of philosophy
Henk Buck (born 1930), Dutch organic chemist
Henk van Dongen (1936–2011), Dutch organizational theorist and policy advisor
Henk Dorgelo (1894–1961), Dutch physicist and academic
Henk van der Flier (born 1945), Dutch psychologist
Henk A. M. J. ten Have (born 1951), Dutch medical ethicist
Henk van de Hulst (1918–2000), Dutch astronomer and mathematician
Henk Lombaers (1920–2007), Dutch mathematician
Henk Schulte Nordholt (1909–1998), Dutch professor of art and cultural history
Henk Schulte Nordholt (born 1953), Dutch professor of Indonesian history 
Henk G. Sol (born 1951), Dutch organizational theorist
Henk Stoof (born 1962), Dutch theoretical physicist
Henk Tennekes (born 1936), Dutch meteorologist
Henk Tennekes (toxicologist) (1950–2020), Dutch toxicologist
Henk Tijms (born 1944), Dutch mathematician and operations researcher
Henk Visser (pediatrician) (born 1930), Dutch pediatrician
Henk Volberda (born 1964),  Dutch organizational theorist and management consultant
Henk van der Vorst (born 1944), Dutch mathematician
Henk Wesseling (1937–2018), Dutch historian
Henk de Wit (1909–1999), Dutch systematic botanist
Henk Zijm (born 1952), Dutch mathematician

Arts and writing
Henk Bos (1901–1979), Dutch painter
Henk Bremmer (1871–1956), Dutch painter, art critic, art teacher, collector and art dealer
Henk Chabot (1894–1949), Dutch painter
Henk Guth (1921–2002), Dutch-Australian painter
Henk Hofland (1927–2016), Dutch journalist, commentator, essayist and columnist
Henk Jonker (1912–2002), Dutch photographer
Henk Krol (born 1950), Dutch journalist, publisher, activist, and politician
Henk Kuijpers (born 1946), Dutch comics artist
Henk van der Meijden (born 1937), Dutch gossip journalist and theater producer
Henk Ngantung (1921–1991), Indonesian painter and politician
Henk Peeters (1925–2013), Dutch modern art painter
Henk Pierneef (1886–1957), South African landscape painter
Henk Schiffmacher (born 1952), Dutch tattoo artist
Henk van Sitteren  (1904–1968), Dutch architect in Singapore and Malaysia
Henk Stallinga (born 1962), Dutch visual artist
Henk Trumpie (born 1937), Dutch ceramist and sculptor
Henk van Ulsen (1927–2009), Dutch stage and television actor
Henk Van der Kolk, Dutch-born Canadian film producer
Henk van der Waal (born 1960), Dutch poet
Henk van Woerden (1947–2005), Dutch painter and writer with close ties to South Africa

Music
 (1944–2011), Dutch composer
Henk Badings (1907–1987), Dutch composer
 (1909–1969), Dutch composer
Henk Bouman (born 1951), Dutch harpsichordist and baroque conductor
Henk Hofstede (born 1951), Dutch pop musician, lead singer of the band "Nits"
Henk Lauwers (born 1956), Belgian baritone singer
Henk Leeuwis (born 1946), Dutch pop singer
Henk van Lijnschooten (1928–2006), Dutch wind orchestra composer
Henk Pleket (1937–2011), Dutch pop singer
Henk Poort (born 1956), Dutch musical actor and opera singer
Henk de Vlieger (born 1953), Dutch percussionist, composer and arranger
Henk van der Vliet (born 1928), Dutch flautist and classical composer
Henk Westbroek (born 1952), Dutch radiohost, singer-songwriter, and political activist
Henk Wijngaard (born 1946), Dutch country singer

Politics and government
Henk Beernink (1910–1979), Dutch politician
Henk Bleker (born 1953), Dutch CDA politician
Henk Chin A Sen (1934–1999), President of Suriname from 1980 to 1982
Henk Feldmeijer (1910–1945), Dutch National Socialist politician and a member of the NSB
Henk van Gerven (born 1955), Dutch politician and general practitioner
Henk Hoekstra (1924–2009), Dutch Communist politician
Henk ten Hoeve (born 1946), Dutch politician
Henk Hofstra (1904–1999), Dutch Labour Party politician
Henk van Hoof (born 1947), Dutch VVD politician
Henk Kamp (born 1952), Dutch VVD politician
Henk Koning (1933–2016), Dutch former tax official and politician
Henk Korthals (1911–1976), Dutch Government Minister
Henk Leenders (born 1955), Dutch Labour Party politician
 (1935–2005), Dutch political scientist and Labour Party politician
Henk Mudge (born 1952), Namibian Republican Party politician
Henk Nijboer (born 1983), Dutch Labour Party politician
Henk Nijhof (born 1952), Dutch politician and educator
Henk Jan Ormel (born 1955), Dutch politician
Henk van Rossum (1919–2017), Dutch politician
Henk Visser (born 1946), Dutch politician
Henk Vonhoff (1931–2010), Dutch VVD politician, state secretary, mayor and Queens commissioner
Henk Vredeling (1924–2007), Dutch Labour Party politician and Minister of Defence
Henk Zeevalking (1922–2005), Dutch Minister of Transport and Water Management
Henk van der Zwan (20 1956), Dutch diplomat

Sports
Henk Angenent (born 1967), Dutch long-distance speed skater
Henk Baars (born 1960), Dutch cyclo-cross cyclist
Henk de Best (1905–1978), Dutch boxer 
Henk Boeve (born 1957), Dutch racing cyclist
Henk Bouwman (1926–1995), Dutch field hockey player
Henk Brouwer (born 1953), Dutch sprinter
Henk Cornelisse (born 1940), Dutch racing cyclist
Henk van Essen (1909–1968), Dutch swimmer
Henk Elzerman (born 1958), Dutch freestyle swimmer
Henk Faanhof (1922–2015), Dutch road bicycle racer
Henk Franken (born 1987), Namibian rugby player
Henk van Gent (born 1951), Dutch competitive sailor
Henk van der Grift (born 1935), Dutch speed skater
Henk Groener (born 1960), Dutch handball coach and player
Henk Grol (born 1985), Dutch judoka
Henk-Jan Held (born 1967), Dutch volleyball player
Henk Hermsen (born 1937), Dutch water polo player
Henk Hille (born 1959), Dutch ice hockey player
Henk de Hoog (1918–1973), Dutch road racing cyclist
Henk Janssen (1890–1969), Dutch tug of war competitor
Henk Keemink (1902–1985), Dutch racewalker
Henk Kersken (1880–1967), Dutch competitive sailor
Henk van Kessel (born 1946), Dutch motorcycle road racer
Henk Krediet (born 1942), Dutch modern pentathlete
Henk de Looper (1912–2006), Dutch field hockey player
Henk Lubberding (born 1953), Dutch road bicycle racer
Henk Meijer (born 1959), Dutch taekwondo competitor and coach
Henk Nieuwkamp (born 1942), Dutch racing cyclist
Henk Nijdam (1935–2009), Dutch road bicycle racer
Henk Norel (born 1987), Dutch basketball player
Henk Numan (born 1955), Dutch judoka
Henk Ooms (1916–1993), Dutch cyclist
Henk Poppe (born 1952), Dutch road bicycle racer
Henk Rouwé (born 1946), Dutch rower
Henk Schenk (born 1945), Dutch-born American Olympic wrestler
Henk Schueler (1922–2016), Dutch speedskater
Henk Starreveld (1914–2008), Dutch sprint canoeist
Henk Temmink (born 1952), Dutch chess player
Henk Visser (1932–2015), Dutch long jumper
Henk Vogels (born 1973), Australian road bicycle racer
Henk van der Wal (1886–1982), Dutch sprint and middle-distance runner
Henk-Jan Zwolle (born 1964), Dutch Olympic rower

Football
Henk Bloemers (1945–2015), Dutch footballer 
Henk Bos (born 1992), Dutch footballer
Henk Bosveld (1941–1998), Dutch footballer
Henk van Brussel (1936–2007), Dutch football player and manager
Henk ten Cate (born 1954), Dutch football manager and player
Henk Dijkhuizen (born 1992), Dutch football defender
Henk Duut (born 1964), Dutch football defender
Henk Fraser (born 1966), Surinamese-Dutch football manager and player
Henk Grim (born 1962), Dutch football striker
Henk Groot (born 1938), Dutch football striker
Henk van Heuckelum (1879–1929), Dutch-Belgian football forward
Henk Hofs (1951–2011), Dutch footballer
Henk Hordijk (1893–1975), Dutch footballer
Henk Houwaart (born 1945), Dutch football manager and player
Henk de Jong (born 1964), Dutch football manager
Henk Muller (1887–1940), Dutch footballer
Henk Nienhuis (1941–2017), Dutch football player and manager
Henk Pellikaan (1910–1999), Dutch football midfielder
Henk Plenter (1913–1997), Dutch football defender
Henk Schouten (born 1932), Dutch football midfielder
Henk van Spaandonck (1913–1982), Dutch football forward
Henk van Stee (born 1961), Dutch football midfielder
Henk Steeman (1894–1979), Dutch footballer
Henk Timmer (born 1971), Dutch football goalkeeper
Henk Veerman (born 1991), Dutch football forward
Henk Vos (born 1968), Dutch football striker and coach
Henk Weerink (1936–2014), Dutch football referee
Henk Wery (born 1943), Dutch football forward
Henk Wisman (born 1957), Dutch football manager
Henk Wullems (born 1936), Dutch football manager

Other
Henk van den Breemen (born 1941), Dutch Marine Corps generals
Henk Bruna (1916–2008), Dutch publisher and bookstore chain director
Henk van Gelderen (1921–2020), Dutch resistance member
Henk Heithuis (1935–1958), Dutch Catholic Church sexual abuse victim
Henk van der Kroon (born 1942), Dutch founder and president of the Federation of European Carnival Cities
Henk Muller (1859–1941), Dutch businessman, diplomat, explorer, publicist, and philanthropist
 (1909–1966), Dutch resistance member, journalist, poet, and newspaper founder and editor
Henk Rogers (born 1953), Dutch video game designer and entrepreneur
Henk Savelberg (born 1953), Dutch chef
Henk Sneevliet (1883–1942), Dutch Communist and World War II resistance member
Henk Sneevlietweg metro station, Amsterdam railway station named after him
Henk Terlingen (born 1941), Dutch radio and television presenter
Henk de Velde (born 1949), Dutch seafarer and solo circumnavigating sailor
Henk Visser (1923–2006)), Dutch arms and armory collector
Henk Zanoli (1923–2015), Dutch lawyer and World War II resistance member
henk de potwis ducht meme

Fictional characters
Cowboy Henk, Belgian surreal humour comic strip series
Henk and Ingrid, fictitious Dutch couple often mentioned in speeches by Geert Wilders as the people he claims to represent
Ome Henk ("Uncle Henk"), the main character of a Dutch CD, DVD and comic series of the same name

As a surname
Dan Henk (born 1972), American artist and writer, noted for his work in tattooing and painting
Ludwig von Henk (1820–1894), German naval officer

See also 

 Hendric
 Hendrick (disambiguation)
 Hendricks (disambiguation)
 Hendrickx
 Hendrik (disambiguation)
 Hendriks
 Hendrikx
 Hendrix (disambiguation)
 Hendryx
 Henrik
 Henry (disambiguation)
 Henryk (given name)

Surnames from given names
Dutch masculine given names
nl:Henk
sv:Henk